The Port d'Ehoala  is a port in southern Madagascar at approx. 10 km from the city of Tôlanaro (Fort-Dauphin).

It was built for the exportations of Ilmenite from the nearby mine of QIT Madagascar Minerals and opened on July 8, 2009.

References

Anosy
Fort-Dauphin (Madagascar)
Port d'Ehola
Transport in Madagascar